Probable serine carboxypeptidase CPVL is an enzyme that in humans is encoded by the CPVL gene. The "CPVL" gene is expressed mainly in monocytes and macrophages, and it is located in the endoplasmatic reticulum and in the endosomal/lysosomal compartment. The distribution of CPVL suggests that the enzyme may be involved in antigen processing and the secretory pathway. Besides those macrophages-rich tissues, the heart and kidney also express high levels of CPVL mRNA.The enzyme is similar to the carboxypeptidases CATHA and SCPEP1, but no direct confirmation of the enzymatic activity was obtained so far.  The exact function of this protein, however, has not been determined.

Structure

Gene 
"CPVL" gene is located at chromosome 7p15.1, consisting of 14 exons. At least two alternatively spliced transcripts which encode the same protein have been observed.

Protein 
The designation of CPVL is a true serine carboxypeptidase. Although the primary sequence displays the expected serine carboxypeptidase active site, the enzymatic activity remains to be demonstrated. The primary sequence of CPVL contains a putative signal sequence, four potential N-linked glycosylation sites and four myristoylation sites, but no transmembrane domain, suggesting that it may be luminal in an organelle and/or involved in the secretory pathway.

Function 

Although the primary sequence of CPVL bears every hallmarks of a serine carboxypeptidase, the enzymatic function of CPVL has not been confirmed. On the basis of its localization, CPVL is postulated to play a role in the biosynthesis of secretory molecules or in the processing and transport of peptides for loading onto MHC I molecules, or in MHC II-dependent APC functions. The high-level expression of CPVL mRNA in heart and kidney implies that CPVL may also have extraimmune functions, such as regulation of cardiovascular homeostasis.

Clinical significance 

The deletion of this gene has been reported associated with Wilms tumor. GWAS show that genetic variations of the CPVL gene are associated with susceptibility to diabetic nephropathy in European Americans, Japanese and Chinese. CPVL is also reported to be one of the four down-regulated proteins which is related to severity of inflammation, and it may be a potential biomarker for identification of infection and prediction of outcome.

References

External links

Further reading